The 2017 Copa Sudamericana Finals were the two-legged final that decides the winner of the 2017 Copa Sudamericana, the 16th edition of the Copa Sudamericana, South America's secondary international club football tournament organized by CONMEBOL.

The finals were contested in two-legged home-and-away format between Argentinian team Independiente and Brazilian team Flamengo. The first leg was hosted by Independiente at Estadio Libertadores de América in Avellaneda on 6 December 2017, while the second leg was hosted by Flamengo at Estádio do Maracanã in Rio de Janeiro on 13 December 2017.

Independiente defeated Flamengo 3–2 on aggregate to win their second Copa Sudamericana title. As champions, Independiente earned the right to play against the winners of the 2017 Copa Libertadores in the 2018 Recopa Sudamericana, and the winners of the 2017 J.League Cup in the 2018 Suruga Bank Championship. They also automatically qualified for the 2018 Copa Libertadores group stage.

Teams

Venues

Road to the final

Format
The finals were played on a home-and-away two-legged basis, with the higher-seeded team hosting the second leg. If tied on aggregate, the away goals rule would not be used, and 30 minutes of extra time would be played. If still tied after extra time, the penalty shoot-out would be used to determine the winner. If extra time was played, a fourth substitution would be allowed.

Matches
Paolo Guerrero (Flamengo), provisionally suspended for failing doping test, missed the first leg. On 7 December 2017, the FIFA Disciplinary Committee decided to suspend Guerrero for one year, missing the second leg. After the Finals, FIFA Appeal Committee reduced the sanction to a six-month suspension.

First leg
Flamengo scored after eight minutes when Réver headed a free kick from Trauco. Independiente equalized through Emmanuel Gigliotti, who combined with Benitez and finished a counter attack. Seven minutes after halftime, Barco crossed from the left side and Maximiliano Meza scored the winning goal with a right-footed volley.

Second leg
Lucas Paquetá opened the scoring meters away from the line in the 29th minute after a low cross from Réver. Ten minutes later, Independiente were awarded a penalty for a foul on Meza by Cuéllar. Ezequiel Barco scored to tie the match.

See also
2017 Copa Libertadores Finals
2018 Recopa Sudamericana
2018 Suruga Bank Championship

References

External links
2017 Copa Sudamericana, CONMEBOL.com 

Finals
2017
Club Atlético Independiente matches
CR Flamengo matches
2017 in Argentine football
2017 in Brazilian football
2017 Copa Sudamericana Finals
Football in Rio de Janeiro (city)
December 2017 sports events in South America